Tom Dearden (born 13 March 2001) is an Australian professional rugby league footballer who plays as a  or  for the North Queensland Cowboys in the NRL (National Rugby League).

He previously played for the Brisbane Broncos. He has played at representative level for Queensland in the State of Origin series.

Background
Dearden was born in Toowoomba, Queensland, Australia.

He settled in Mackay and attended Mackay State High School till grade 10. He played his junior rugby league for the Brothers Bulldogs Mackay before moving to the Gold Coast, where he played for the Currumbin Eagles and attended Palm Beach Currumbin State High School.

Career

Early career
In 2016, Dearden played for the Mackay Cutters Cyril Connell Cup side. In 2017, he moved to the Gold Coast to play at the Currumbin Eagles in their undefeated U16 premiership winning side under the guise of ex Melbourne Storm player and now coach Matt Geyer. in the Currumbin U16 side, Dearden played along side fellow Queensland team mate Xavier Coates and current Titans half, Toby Sexton. Dearden represented the Queensland under-16 side.

In 2018, he played for the Tweed Heads Seagulls Mal Meninga Cup side, who made it to the semi-finals of the competition, and later represented the Queensland under-18 team. Later that season, he was a member of Palm Beach Currumbin State High School's ARL Schoolboy Cup winning side, receiving the Peter Sterling Medal for player of the tournament. In November and December 2018, he was a member of the Australian Schoolboys tour of England.

2019
In Round 8 of the 2019 NRL season, Dearden made his NRL debut for the Brisbane Broncos against the South Sydney Rabbitohs.

2020
Dearden made 12 appearances for Brisbane in the 2020 NRL season as the club suffered their worst ever year both on and off the field culminating in the club's first Wooden Spoon.

2021
Dearden began the 2021 season playing for the Souths Logan Magpies in the Queensland Cup, before being recalled into the Brisbane side in Round 3.

On 26 April, he signed a three-year contract with the North Queensland Cowboys, starting in 2022. On 29 May, he secured an immediate release from the Brisbane Broncos to join the North Queensland Cowboys for the remainder of the 2021 NRL season.

Dearden made his North Queensland debut in round 14 against Manly-Warringah in a 50-18 defeat.

In Round 20, Dearden played his first game against his ex club Brisbane Broncos, Dearden scored a try in the 37-18 loss.  In round 24, North Queensland defeated St. George Illawarra 38-26. It was Dearden's first win at the club and first win in any NRL match since round 3 when he was at Brisbane, ending 14 losses in a row as a player.

2022
Following a strong start to the season for North Queensland, Dearden was selected in the extended Queensland Maroons squad for Game 1 of State of Origin in Sydney. In Game 2, he was named 18th man before making his debut at Five-Eighth in the decider for Game 3 where Queensland emerged victorious 22-12.
On May 16 during Magic round, Dearden famously got into a physical altercation with Alex Twal resulting in both players being sin binned. Dearden played 23 matches for North Queensland in the 2022 NRL season as the club finished third on the table and qualified for the finals.  He played in both finals matches including their preliminary final loss to Parramatta.

References

External links

NRL profile

2001 births
Living people
Australian rugby league players
Brisbane Broncos players
North Queensland Cowboys players
Rugby league halfbacks
Rugby league players from Toowoomba
Souths Logan Magpies players
Wynnum Manly Seagulls players